Willows-Glenn County Airport  is a county-owned, public-use airport located one nautical mile (2 km) west of the central business district of Willows, a city in Glenn County, California, United States. This airport is included in the National Plan of Integrated Airport Systems for 2011–2015, which categorized it as a general aviation facility. It is also known as Willows-Glenn Airport.

History

The War Department acquired  by a lease (numbers W 868-ENG-2344 and W2972-ENG-1045) with Glenn County, California, in 1942. The site was used as an auxiliary airfield for Chico Army Airfield. The only improvement to the site was the asphalt runway. The Fourth Air Force declared the field excess to its needs on July 24, 1944. The lease was terminated June 11, 1945.

Facilities and aircraft 
Willows-Glenn County Airport covers an area of 320 acres (129 ha) at an elevation of 141 feet (43 m) above mean sea level. It has two asphalt paved runways: 16/34 is 4,125 by 100 feet (1,257 x 30 m) and 13/31 is 3,788 by 60 feet (1,155 x 18 m). It also has one helipad designated H1 with a concrete surface measuring is 60 by 60 feet (18 x 18 m).

For the 12-month period ending March 31, 2011, the airport had 29,500 general aviation aircraft operations, an average of 80 per day. At that time there were 34 aircraft based at this airport: 88% single-engine, 3% jet, and 9% helicopter.

See also 
 
 California World War II Army Airfields

References

External links 
 Airport page at Glenn County website
 Aerial image as of August 1998 from USGS The National Map
 

Airports in Glenn County, California
Willows, California
Airfields of the United States Army Air Forces in California